Habenaria praecox, commonly known as the early rein orchid, is a species of orchid that is endemic to the north coast of Queensland. It has between two and four narrow, upright leaves at its base and up to thirty five small white flowers with a green dorsal sepal.

Description 
The labellum has three lobes. Flowering occurs from December to January.

Taxonomy and naming
Habenaria praecox was first formally described in 1999 by Bill Lavarack and Alick Dockrill from a specimen collected near Cardwell and the description was published in Austrobaileya. The specific epithet (praecox) is a Latin word meaning "early ripe" or "premature".

Distribution and habitat
The early rein orchid grows with grasses and sedges in forests between Coen and Proserpine.

References

Orchids of Queensland
Endemic orchids of Australia
Plants described in 1999
praecox